Paulo Henrique Athanazio, commonly referred to as Dodô, is a Brazilian footballer who plays as a midfielder for Botafogo-SP.

Career
Dodô came through the youth ranks at Comercial-SP, signing for Botafogo-SP in 2018 and playing in the Under 20 Campeonato Paulista and Copa São Paulo de Futebol Júnior in 2019. His performance in a friendly between the U20 and Senior teams at Botafogo-SP in April 2019 earned him a call into the senior squad.

He made his national league debut in 2019 Campeonato Brasileiro Série B as a substitute against Vila Nova on 18 May 2019, but a contractual issue prevented him making more appearances and he returned to work with the U20 side.

References

External links
 

Living people
2000 births
Brazilian footballers
Association football midfielders
Botafogo Futebol Clube (SP) players
Campeonato Brasileiro Série B players